The 1931 St. Xavier Musketeers football team was an American football team that represented Xavier University as a member of the Ohio Athletic Conference (OAC) during the 1931 college football season. In its 12th season under head coach Joseph A. Meyer, the team compiled a 4–3–1 record (1–0–1 against OAC opponents) and outscored all opponents by a total of 107 to 38.

Schedule

References

St. Xavier
Xavier Musketeers football seasons
St. Xavier Musketeers football